The 1994–95 BBL season was known as the Budweiser League for sponsorship reasons. The season featured a total of 13 teams, playing 36 games each. A major change saw the Guildford Kings franchise fold due to the club being unable to negotiate a viable contract with the owners of the Guildford Spectrum. The league sold Kings' licence to a group headed by Robert Earl, Ed Simons and Harvey Goldsmith, who established the Leopards. Oldham Celtics dropped down a division to National League Division One.

Newcomers Sheffield Sharks formerly Sheffield Forgers won the regular season and claimed the title in their rookie season in addition to becoming National Cup champions. Seventh-seed Worthing Bears caused a huge upset in the post-season Play-off to take the Championship crown with a memorable victory over Manchester Giants in the final. The Thames Valley Tigers secured the BBL Trophy.

Budweiser League Championship (Tier 1)

Final standings

The play-offs

Quarter-finals 
(1) Sheffield Sharks vs. (8) Birmingham Bullets

(2) Thames Valley Tigers vs. (7) Worthing Bears

(3) London Towers vs. (6) Leopards

(4) Manchester Giants vs. (5) Doncaster Panthers

Semi-finals

Final

National League Division 1 (Tier 2)

Final standings

National League Division 2 (Tier 3)

Final standings

National Cup

Fourth round

Quarter-finals

Semi-finals

Final

7 Up Trophy

Group stage 
North Group 1
North Group 2
South Group 1
South Group 2

Sheffield finished ahead of Manchester by having the best head-to-head record between the teams. Thames Valley finished ahead of Birmingham by having the best head-to-head record between the teams.

Semi-finals 
Doncaster Panthers vs. Sheffield Sharks

Thames Valley Tigers vs. Worthing Bears

Final

Seasonal awards 

 Most Valuable Player: Roger Huggins (Sheffield Sharks)
 Coach of the Year: Jim Brandon (Sheffield Sharks)
 All-Star Team:
 Roger Huggins (Sheffield Sharks)
 Karl Brown (Leopards)
 Steve Bucknall (London Towers)
 Chris Fite (Doncaster Panthers)
 Herman Harried (Worthing Bears)
 Nigel Lloyd (Birmingham Bullets)
 Mark Robinson (Manchester Giants)
 Peter Scantlebury (Thames Valley Tigers)
 Tony Windless (London Towers)
 Robert Youngblood (Leopards)

References 

British Basketball League seasons
1
British